Robert Kerštajn (born 5 September 1967) is a Slovenian cross-country skier. He competed in the men's 10 kilometre classical event at the 1992 Winter Olympics.

References

1967 births
Living people
Slovenian male cross-country skiers
Olympic cross-country skiers of Slovenia
Cross-country skiers at the 1992 Winter Olympics
People from Kranjska Gora